The Minister for Social Inclusion was a position that existed in the Australian government between 2007 and 2013. The position ceased to exist with the abolition of the role on 1 July 2013. While it existed, this role was part of the Prime Minister and Cabinet portfolio.

List of Social Inclusion ministers

References

Social Inclusion